The Malayalam Calendar is a sidereal solar calendar used in Kerala. The origin of the calendar has been dated to 825 CE, the beginning of the Kollam Era.

There are many theories regarding the origin of the era, but according to recent scholarship, it commemorated the foundation of Kollam after the liberation of the southern Chera kingdom (known as Venadu) from the Chola dynasty's rule by or with the assistance of the Chera emperor at Kodungallur. The origin of the Kollam Era has been dated to 825 CE, at the end of the three year-long great convention in Kollam held at the behest of the Venadu King Kulasekharan. Scholars from west and east were present in the convention, and the Thamizh Kanakku (Calendar) was adopted. 

Kollam was the capital of Venadu and an important port town of the Chera Kingdom in that period. Kollam Aandu was adapted in the entire Chera Kingdom (the current day states of Tamil Nadu, Karnataka and Kerala), the majority of which is now in Kerala. In Malayalam-speaking Kerala, it is now called the Malayalam Era or 'Kollavarsham’ (Kollam Thontri Aandu). The earliest available record mentioning the Kollam Era is a royal decree by Sri Vallavan Goda, the King of Venadu, dated to c. 973 CE (Kollam Era 149). In the inscription, the phrase "Kollam Thontri Aandu" is employed. Another era, referred to as "Kollam Azhintha Aadu", counting from 1097 CE, was reckoned by the Cholas for some time. It is tentatively calculated that the Chola overlords captured the port of Kollam in 1097 CE.

History 
The origin of the Kollam Era has been dated to 825 CE, when the great convention in Kollam was held at the behest of King Kulashekharan. Kollam was an important town in that period, and the Malayalam Era is called 'Kollavarsham', possibly as a result of the Tharisapalli plates. 

There are multiple conflicting accounts regarding the origins of the Malayalam calendar, some of which are mentioned below:

It is believed that the era was started by the Syrian Christian saints Mar Sabor and Mar Proth who settled in Korukeni, Kollam, near to the present Kollam. The Tharisapalli copper plates were issued to them.
The Kollam era is attributed to the legend of the hero Paraśurāma, an avatar (incarnation) of the god Vishnu. It is sometimes divided into cycles of 1,000 years reckoned from 1176 BCE. Thus, 825 CE would have been the first year of the era's third millennium.
The news of the physical disappearance of Sri Adi Shankaracharya in 820 CE at Kedarnath reached Kerala only a few years later. It is believed that Kerala began the Malayalam era, also called the Kollam era, in 825 CE in his memory. 
According to Hermann Gundert, Kollavarsham started as part of erecting a new Shiva Temple in Kollam and because of the strictly local and religious background, the other regions did not follow this system at first. Once Kollam port emerged as an important trade center, however, the other countries also started to follow the new system of calendar. This theory backs the remarks of Ibn Battuta as well.
It is also believed that the era started as part of erection of the Thirupalkadal Sreekrishnaswamy Temple, family temple of Venad located at Keezhperoor or Kil-perur. Keezhperoor is a place located near Kilimanoor, which is used as prefix along with name of Venad and Travancore monarchs and is believed to be the maternal home of Kulasekhara Alvar.

Months
Makaram month (middle of January) was the starting of the Kollam Aandu (year). It was similar to the other calendars followed in the Pandya and Chola Kingdoms. The Chera kingdom had two harvests, one in Makaram and the other in Kanni, so the year started in Makaram, the harvesting month. Later, in the 20th century, after Venadu (the Travancore Kingdom) joined the Indian Union, the Calendar was aligned with that of the Sanskrit Calendar to have the Year Starting in Medam (April middle).

The Malayalam months and the Sanskritic Sauramāsa (solar month) are almost the same, raising many doubts that which came first. If you see, Chingam is a month in Kollam Era. Sanskrit also has the solar month, the Simham, and so on. This is unlike the case in Tulu calendar which follow the names of lunar months. The following are the months of the astronomical Malayalam calendar:

Days 
The days of the week in the Malayalam calendar are suffixed with Aazhcha, meaning week.

Like the months above, there are twenty seven stars starting from Aswati (Ashvinī in Sanskrit) and ending in Revatī. The 365 days of the year are divided into groups of fourteen days called Ñattuvela, each one bearing the name of a star.

Significant dates 
Vishu (1st Medam): Malayali New Year (traditional)
Onam
1st Chingam: Malayali New Year (as per the Kollam Era calendar)

Vishu, celebrated on the first day of Medam, and Onam, celebrated on the star Thiruvonam  in the month of Chingam, are two of the major festivals.  The first day of Chingam is celebrated as the Kerala New Year, replacing Vishu, which was considered the beginning of a year until 825 CE. Vishu is still celebrated as the traditional Malayali New Year, particularly in erstwhile Malabar and South Canara areas, as it is astronomically significant, 'Medam' being the first among the 12 rashis (the zodiac signs corresponding to the 12 months of a solar year).

The Makaravilakku festival is celebrated in the Ayyappa Temple at Sabarimala on the first day of Makaram month. This marks the grand finale of the two-month period to the Sabarimala pilgrimage. The 1st of Makaram marks the winter Solstice (Uttarayanam) and the 1st of Karkaṭakam marks the summer solstice (Dakshinayanam) according to the Malayalam calendar (according to the astronomical calendar, the summer solstice is on 21 June, and the winter solstice on 21 December).

Chaitram 1 (usually coinciding with 20 March) or Medam 1 (mostly coinciding with 14 April, for 2019 it was on 15 April), both in the proximity of the date of the vernal equinox (21 March), mark the beginning of the new year in many traditional Indian calendars such as the Indian national calendar and the Tamil calendar. When the Government of Kerala adopted Kolla Varsham as the regional calendar, the first of Chingam, the month of the festival of Onam, was accepted as the Malayalam New Year instead.

Derived names
Many events in Kerala are related to the dates in the Malayalam calendar.

The agricultural activities of Kerala are centred on the seasons. The southwest monsoon which starts around 1 June is known as Etavappathi, meaning mid of month Etavam. The northeast monsoon which starts during mid October is called thulavarsham (rain in the month of thulam). The two harvests of paddy are called Kannikkoythu and Makarakkoythu (harvests in the months kanni and makaram) respectively.

See also 
 Bengali calendar
 Hindu calendar
 Manipuri calendar
 Tamil calendar
 Great flood of 99, in Kerala in 1924 CE, or 1099 ME

References

External links 

 Free Malayalam Calendar for Android and iPhone without download
 Hindu Panchangam Calendar in Malayalam
 Malayalam calendar with panchangam
 Malayalam Panchang Calendars with Tithi, Nakshtra etc
 Open Source software libraries for Malayalam Calendar

History of Kollam
Hindu calendar
Calendar eras
Culture of Kerala
Specific calendars

Time in India
Solar calendars